The San Gorgonio River is a  river primarily flowing in western Riverside County, with a small upstream section in southwestern San Bernardino County, in southern California.

Geography
The river's headwaters arise in the San Bernardino Mountains, southwest of San Gorgonio Mountain at the southern base of Galena Peak within Sand to Snow National Monument.

The river flows southwest through Banning Canyon then cuts back southeast through the town of Banning, California. It drains the land east of the San Gorgonio Pass, while the South Fork of the Santa Ana River drains the land west.

The river is intermittent, with significant flow only following winter storms and snowmelt in the spring.

References

Rivers of Riverside County, California
Rivers of San Bernardino County, California
San Gorgonio Pass
Coachella Valley
San Bernardino Mountains
Sand to Snow National Monument
Rivers of Southern California